Belenkaya is a stratovolcano located in the southern part of Kamchatka Peninsula, Russia.

See also
List of volcanoes in Russia

References 
 

Mountains of the Kamchatka Peninsula
Volcanoes of the Kamchatka Peninsula
Stratovolcanoes of Russia
Pleistocene stratovolcanoes
Holocene Asia